Esquibien is a former commune in the Finistère department of Brittany in north-western France. On 1 January 2016, it was merged into the commune Audierne.

Population

Inhabitants of Esquibien are called in French Esquibiennois.

See also
Communes of the Finistère department

References

External links
Official website 

Former communes of Finistère
Populated coastal places in France